Ayeyarwady (and similar alternate spellings) may refer to:

 The Ayeyarwady Region in Myanmar
 Ayeyarwady River, another name of the Irrawaddy River